Thomas Johnson (July 11, 1802 – January 2, 1865) was an American missionary in Kansas who founded the Shawnee Methodist Mission in 1830. It was intended to serve and convert the Shawnee, several hundred of whom had been relocated to Kansas Indian Territory from east of the Mississippi River.

Johnson was a Kansas slave holder and sided strongly with the pro-slavery group during a period known as Bleeding Kansas. Residents on either side of the slavery question recruited newcomers and fought violently prior to voting as to whether slavery would be allowed in the territory. Johnson was elected as a member of the Kansas territorial legislature, which temporarily designated Shawnee Mission as the state capital from 1855 to 1856. Johnson was pro-Southern in sympathy but signed a Unionist pledge at the time of the American Civil War. 

Johnson County, Kansas is named for him.

Death
Johnson was murdered at his home on January 2, 1865, in the last year of the Civil War. It is unknown whether he was killed during commission of a robbery or whether it was a political assassination.  Some historians have suggested that his murderers were outraged at his apparent betrayal of the Southern cause.

References

1802 births
1865 deaths
American Methodist missionaries
American proslavery activists
People murdered in Kansas
Deaths by firearm in Kansas
Assassinated American politicians
Methodist missionaries in the United States

Assassinated American territory politician